Ernesto Aparicio Ortega (11 March 1910 – 2 March 2006) was a Venezuelan professional baseball player and manager.

Aparicio was born in Maracaibo, Zulia. His younger brother, Luis Aparicio, Sr., played baseball from 1931 through 1954 and his nephew, Luis Aparicio, was admitted to the Baseball Hall of Fame in 1984.

Aparicio was a manager and instructor for both professional and amateur baseball. He played with several teams during the 1930s and early 1940s, while managing the National Team in international competition and leading Gavilanes BBC to nine championship titles in the Zulian Professional League, setting a record for the most titles won by a manager in Venezuelan baseball history.

Aparicio managed the Sabios de Vargas team and founded a youth baseball academy in which he trained dozens of teenage boys including his nephew Luis Jr. and future major league manager Ozzie Guillén.

In 2005, he was inducted into the Venezuelan Baseball Hall of Fame and Museum as part of their 2nd class.

Aparicio died in 2006 in the city of Los Teques, Miranda, nine days short of his 96th birthday.

Sources

1910 births
2006 deaths
Baseball infielders
Baseball managers
Gavilanes de Maracaibo players
Navegantes del Magallanes players
People from Los Teques
Sportspeople from Maracaibo
Venezuelan baseball players